The Samsung Galaxy M04 is an Android-based smartphone designed, and manufactured by Samsung Electronics. It was announced on December 10, 2022, and released on December 16, 2022.

References 

Samsung Galaxy
Android (operating system) devices
Mobile phones introduced in 2022
Samsung smartphones
Mobile phones with multiple rear cameras
Samsung mobile phones